The 2015 Plateau State gubernatorial election occurred on April 11, 2015. APC's Simon Lalong won election for a first term, defeating Gyang Pwajok of the PDP and four minor party candidates. Lalong won in 11 LGAs, receiving 51.83% of the vote, while Pwajok won the remaining six of the 17 LGAs of the state, receiving 47.76% of the total votes, trailing behind Lalong with 44,386 votes margin.

Simon Lalong defeated four other aspirants in the APC gubernatorial primary to emerge as the party's candidate. He picked Yilji Gomwalk as his running mate.

Gyang Pwajok was the PDP candidate with Sonni Tyoden as his running mate.

Electoral system
The Governor of Plateau State is elected using the plurality voting system.

Primary election

APC primary
The APC primary election began at 08:30 pm Thursday 4 December 2014, ending in the early hours of Friday 5 December 2014. Former Speaker, Plateau State House of Assembly, Barr. Simon Lalong, won the primary election polling 2,222 votes against other candidates. Emmanuel Garba polled 304 votes; Solomon Dalung, 293 votes; Elijah Miner, 50 votes; and Vemark Dangin, zero vote. There were 2,964 delegates from across the 17 LGAs of the state.

Candidates
Party nominee: Simon Lalong.
Running mate:  Sonni Gwanle Tyoden.
 Emmanuel Garba
 Solomon Dalung
 Elijah Miner
 Vemark Dangin

PDP primary
The PDP primary election was held on December 8, 2014. (A court earlier restrained the election from taking place on this date.) A total of 818 delegates from across the state were accredited. Incumbent senator representing Plateau North Senatorial District, Gyang Pwajok, emerged the winner after polling as announced, 435 votes. Ignatius Longjan was closest contestant with 163 votes. Sen. Victor Lar, 109 votes; Kemi Nicholas Nshe, 31 votes; Dr. Haruna Dabin polled 16 votes; Bitrus Nabasu, 10 votes; John Clark Dabwan, seven votes; Prof. Sonni Tyoden, seven votes; Chris Bature, five votes; Godfrey Miri, four votes; Arc. John Alkali, three votes; Joseph Golwa, two votes; Fidelis Tapgun, one vote; Nandom Pyenap, one vote; Jimmy Cheto, zero vote; and Prof. Longmas Wapmuk, zero vote. 12 of these 16 aspirants later called for the cancellation of the results.

Candidates
Party nominee: Gyang Pwajok.
Running mate: Sonni Tyoden.
 Ignatius Longjan: Incumbent deputy governor
 Victor Lar
 Kemi Nshe
 Haruna Dabin
 Bitrus Nabasu
 John Clark Dabwan 
 Chris Bature
 Godfrey Miri
 John Alkali
 Joseph Golwa
 Fidelis Tapgun
 Nandom Pyenap
 Jimmy Cheto
 Longmas Wapmuk

Results
A total of six candidates registered with the Independent National Electoral Commission to contest in the election. APC candidate Simon Lalong won the election for a first term, defeating PDP Gyang Pwajok and several minor party candidates. Lalong received 51.83% of the votes, while Pwajok received 47.76%. There were 1,508,585 registered voters from across the state.

By local government area
Here are the results of the election by local government area for the two major parties. Blue represents LGAs won by Lalong. Green represents LGAs won by Pwajok.

References 

Plateau State gubernatorial elections
Gubernatorial election 2020
Plateau State gubernatorial election